Ghost Rider (Agents of S.H.I.E.L.D.) may refer to:

 Johnny Blaze (Agents of S.H.I.E.L.D.), the first Ghost Rider
 Robbie Reyes (Agents of S.H.I.E.L.D.), the second Ghost Rider
 "Ghost Rider" (Agents of S.H.I.E.L.D. arc), a season 4 story arc